The Battle of the Volturnus, also known as the Battle of Casilinum or Battle of Capua, was fought in 554 between an army of the Byzantine (Eastern Roman) Empire and a combined force of Franks and Alemanni. The Byzantines, led by the old eunuch general Narses, were victorious.

Background 
During the later stages of the Gothic War, the Gothic king Teia called upon the Franks for help against the Roman armies under the eunuch Narses. Although King Theudebald refused to send aid, he allowed two of his subjects, the Alemanni chieftains Leutharis and Butilinus, to cross into Italy. According to the historian Agathias, the two brothers gathered a host of 75,000 Franks and Alemanni, and in early 553 crossed the Alps and took the town of Parma. They defeated a force under the Heruli commander Fulcaris, and soon many Goths from northern Italy joined their forces. In the meantime, Narses dispersed his troops to garrisons throughout central Italy, and himself wintered at Rome.

In the spring of 554, the two brothers invaded central Italy, plundering as they descended southwards. At Samnium they divided their forces, with Butilinus and the larger part of the army marching south towards Campania and the Strait of Messina. Leutharis led the remainder towards Apulia and Otranto, but soon turned back home, laden with spoils. His vanguard, however, was heavily defeated by the Armenian Byzantine Artabanes at Fanum, leaving most of the booty behind. The remainder managed to reach northern Italy and cross the Alps into Frankish territory, but not before losing more men to a plague, including Leutharis himself.

Butilinus, on the other hand, more ambitious and possibly persuaded by the Goths to restore their kingdom with himself as king, resolved to remain. His army was infected by dysentery, so that it was reduced from its original size of 30,000 to a size close to that of Narses' forces. In summer, Butilinus marched back to Campania and erected camp on the banks of the Volturnus, covering its exposed sides with an earthen rampart, reinforced by his numerous supply wagons. A bridge over the river was fortified by a wooden tower, heavily garrisoned by the Franks.

Deployment

When Narses found out about the location of the Frankish camp, he set forth at the head of an 18,000 strong force, including strong contingents of Heruli mercenaries. His army included infantry, heavy cavalry, and horse archers, and was thus at an advantage over the mostly infantry-based enemy forces. As the Romans approached the Frankish camp, Narses sent an Armenian officer, Charananges, with a cavalry force to cut the Franks' supply. Indeed, Charananges not only captured several wagons, but used one of them to set fire to the large watchtower guarding the bridge. After this first skirmish, both sides exited their camps and formed up for battle. At that point, an incident almost wrecked the Byzantine plans. A Heruli captain killed a servant, and when confronted by Narses, refused to acknowledge any fault. Narses had him executed, whereupon the rest of the Heruli announced that they refused to fight. Nevertheless, Narses drew up his forces for battle. Faced with the solid and deep-arrayed Frankish infantry, he chose a disposition similar to that of the Battle of Taginae, with the infantry in the centre, backed by archers, and the cavalry on the wings. Narses himself took command of the right wing, while Artabanes and Valerian were placed in charge of the left wing. Part of the left wing was also concealed in a wood that grew there. At the pleas of the Heruli general, Sindual, who promised to persuade his men to fight, he left a gap in the middle of the infantry, which the Heruli were to occupy.

Battle
However, two Heruli had deserted to the Franks, and persuaded Butilinus to attack now while the Heruli stayed out of the battle. The Franks arrayed in a large wedge formation and advanced, and smashed into the Byzantine centre. They quickly penetrated the gap left by the Heruli, but Narses commanded his cavalry, which included many horse archers, to wheel on their flanks and attack the Franks from their exposed rear. The Franks, already engaged with the Byzantine infantry, were unable to turn and face their more mobile enemies in the rear. As confusion started to spread amongst them, the Heruli finally returned to the fray. In the words of J.B. Bury, "... then Sindual and his Heruli appeared upon the scene. The defeat of the Franks was already certain; it was now to be annihilation."

Aftermath
Butilinus and most of his men perished, while Roman casualties were small. Agathias gives the impossibly low number of 80 Byzantine casualties, while claiming that only five Goths survived. Whatever the true numbers, it was a magnificent victory for Narses, and signaled the final triumph of the Byzantine Empire in Italy. Despite Narses' great victories, the war was not finished. Seven thousand Goths held out at Campsa, near Naples until they capitulated in the spring of 555. The lands and cities across the River Po were still held by Franks and Goths, and it was not until 562 that their last strongholds, the cities of Verona and Brixia, were subjugated.

Citations

Sources 

the Volturnus 554
Volturnus 554
Volturnus 554
Volturnus
the Volturnus 554
550s in the Byzantine Empire
554
6th century in Italy
Capua (ancient city)